Michaela Haet (born 12 February 1999) is an Australian tennis player.

Haet has a career high WTA singles ranking of 521, achieved on 7 August 2017. She has won two singles titles on the ITF Women's Circuit.

Haet made her WTA Tour main-draw debut at the 2022 Sydney International, where she partnered Lisa Mays in the doubles event.

ITF Circuit finals

Singles: 2 (2 titles)

References

External links
 
 
 Michaela Haet at Tennis Australia
 Michaela Haet at Rice University

1999 births
Living people
Australian female tennis players
Tennis players from Sydney
Sportspeople from Greenwich, Connecticut
Rice Owls women's tennis players